Ramjerd (formerly, Kushkak, also Romanized as Kūshkak) is a city and capital of Dorudzan District, in Marvdasht County, Fars Province, Iran.  At the 2006 census, its population was 2,033, in 446 families.  The name of Kushkak village was changed to Ramjerd upon obtaining city status.

References

Populated places in Marvdasht County

Cities in Fars Province